La Bulaqueña, literally "the woman from Bulacan" or "the Bulacan woman", also sometimes referred to as Una Bulaqueña ("a woman from Bulacan"), is the Spanish title of an 1895 painting by Filipino painter and revolutionary activist Juan Novicio Luna.  Bulacan is a province in the Philippines in Luzon island and its residents are called Bulaqueños, also spelled as Bulakenyos (Bulakenyo for men and Bulakenya for women) in the Filipino language.  It is a "serene portrait", of a Filipino woman wearing a María Clara gown, a traditional Filipino dress that is composed of four pieces, namely the camisa, the saya (long skirt), the pañuelo (neck cover), and the tapis (knee-length overskirt).  The name of the dress is an eponym to María Clara, the mestiza heroine of Filipino hero José Rizal's novel Noli Me Tangere.  The woman's clothing in the painting is the reason why the masterpiece is alternately referred to as María Clara.  It is one of the few canvases done by Luna illustrating Filipino culture.  The painting is displayed at the National Museum of Fine Arts.

Identity of the woman

Filipino art experts, historians, and researchers have four recommendations on the identity of the woman depicted in Luna's La Bulaqueña despite the absence of photographs.  According to E.A. Cruz, a columnist for the Philippine Daily Globe newspaper, the woman in the portrait could be one of the women courted by Luna after losing his wife Paz Pardo de Tavera.  Luna accidentally killed his wife and mother-in-law because of jealousy.  The woman could also be a woman courted by Juan Luna's brother, Antonio Luna.  Two existing references suggested that it was the daughter of a prominent Filipino family who Luna was not able to marry or, as mentioned earlier, a woman wooed by Luna's brother, Antonio.  The two books suggested that the woman was one of the daughters of Doña Mariquita Sabas who lived in 2 Espeleta Street, Binondo, Manila, a place frequented by Luna himself and his brother Antonio for tertulia gatherings. Doña Sabas had two daughters, namely Dolores nicknamed Loleng and Francisca monickered Paquita.  It was Dolores who is believed most likely to be the woman portrayed in Luna's La Bulaqueña.  However, according to Rosalinda Orosa, the owner of Luna's other painting, the Tampuhan, the woman could be Emiliana Trinidad, the mother of Orosa's niece-in-law and the same woman who was the sitter for Luna's Tampuhan painting. Orosa's claim prevailed as there are existing photographs of Emiliana Trinidad.  

According to Dr. Asunción N. Fernando, the woman could be María "Iyang" Rodrigo Fernando, Asunción Fernando's own grandmother who assisted in the cause of the Katipunan.  María Rodrigo Fernando was the bringer of food and courier of messages to Katipuneros hiding in the fields outside her hometown.  Historian Antonio Valeriano noted that the woman in the portrait has similar facial features of the Rodrigos which include the "bushy eyebrows and sad eyes" such as that of Francisco "Soc" Rodrigo.  Belen Ponferrada of the Museum of Malacañang conforms with the findings of the research regarding the woman's possible identity.

References

External links
Portrait of a Bulakenya by Juan Luna at flickr.com
Detail of Juan Luna's Bulakenya at flickr.com
Other paintings by Luna at flickr.com

1895 paintings
Paintings by Juan Luna
Collections of the National Museum of the Philippines